Mária Žernovič (née Kostelanská; born 8 January 1993) is a Slovak female volleyball player. She is part of the Slovakia women's national volleyball team. She competed at the 2019 Women's European Volleyball Championship.

Clubs
  ŠŠK OA Považská Bystrica (none–2012)
  VTC Pezinok (2012–2016)
  Hit UCM Trnava (2016–2017)
  Vasas Budapest (2017–present)

References

External links 

 Profile on official website of club
 Profile on CEV

1993 births
Living people
Slovak women's volleyball players
Slovak expatriate sportspeople in Hungary
Sportspeople from Považská Bystrica